Armand Benjamin Cloete is a South African politician who has been a member of the Free State Provincial Legislature since 2021. He had previously served as a permanent delegate to the National Council of Provinces from the Free State from 2019 to 2021. Cloete is a member of the Freedom Front Plus (FF Plus).

Biography
He studied at the University of the Free State. He worked for the Democratic Alliance as a Media Liaison Officer before joining the FF Plus. He was elected to the National Council of Provinces following the 2019 South African general election held on 8 May.  Cloete was sworn in as an MP on 23 May 2019. He was one of six permanent delegates from the Free State.

On 4 May 2021, he was sworn in as a member of the Free State Provincial Legislature. He replaced Devar Smit, who resigned. Michiel De Bruyn was appointed to the NCOP.

Cloete is married and resides in Bloemfontein.

References

External links
Mr Armand Benjamin Cloete – Parliament of South Africa
Armand Benjamin Cloete – People's Assembly
Profile on Linkedin

Living people
Year of birth missing (living people)
Afrikaner people
People from Bloemfontein
People from the Free State (province)
Members of the National Council of Provinces
Members of the Free State Provincial Legislature
Freedom Front Plus politicians
Democratic Alliance (South Africa) politicians
University of the Free State alumni